Ali Younesi (born 26 August 1955) is an Iranian politician, who served in different positions.

Education
Younesi is a graduate of the Haqqani school in Qom.

Career

Following the Islamic Revolution, Younesi became the head of the Islamic Revolutionary Court of Tehran and later head of the politico-ideological bureau of Islamic Revolutionary Guards. He was minister of intelligence and a member of the Supreme National Security Council during the presidency Mohammad Khatami. He was Hassan Rouhani's adviser on political and security affairs.

References

External links 

1955 births
Living people
Iranian Shia clerics
People from Nahavand
Ministers of Intelligence of Iran
Presidential aides of Iran